Before Green Gables is the title of a prequel to the Anne Shirley series. The book was published in 2008 by Puffin, a division of Penguin Books, as part of Puffin's celebration of Anne Shirley's centennial anniversary, which sees the Anne Shirley series re-released to commemorate the event. The first book in the Anne Shirley series was Anne of Green Gables, which was published in 1908.

The author of the prequel is Canadian children's author Budge Wilson. In the official press release, Budge Wilson wrote: "I will, of course, try to be true to the astonishing character that Lucy Maud Montgomery created… But I would not – in fact, could not – presume to tell my part of Anne's history in Montgomery's voice. I will do this in my own voice, hoping that she would approve of the project if she were alive today."

Synopsis 

This book describes Anne's difficult pre-Green-Gables childhood. That time includes the deaths of her parents, her subsequent life with the Thomas and later the Hammond families, and her time in an orphanage.

Publisher
Three editions are available from different publishers:
 Canada: Viking Canada (AHC), 
 US: Putnam Pub Group, 
 UK: Penguin Books,

Translation
Before Green Gables was translated into Japanese as a title of Kon'nichiwa Anne (meaning "Hello, Anne") and sold by Shinchosha and Polish as Droga do Zielonego Wzgórza (meaning "Road/Way to Green Gables"), published by Wydawnictwo Literackie. The book was also translated in French as a title of Anne... : Avant la maison aux pignons verts (meaning "Anne : Before Green Gables..."), published by Trécarré.

Criticism
Benjamin Lefebvre, co-chairman of the L.M. Montgomery Research Group wrote an article about this book.

Adaptations
The series was adapted into an anime, Kon'nichiwa Anne: Before Green Gables, the latest entry in Nippon Animation's World Masterpiece Theater series. It aired in Japan from April 5, 2009 to December 27, 2009.

External links
 L.M. Montgomery Online This scholarly site includes a blog, an extensive bibliography of reference materials, and a complete filmography of all adaptations of Montgomery texts. See, in particular, the page devoted to Before Green Gables.

See also
Anne of Green Gables: A New Beginning, a prequel television film released in 2008.

References 

Anne of Green Gables books
Prequel novels
Novels set in Nova Scotia
2008 Canadian novels
Canadian children's novels
2008 children's books